Testis expressed 19 is a protein that in humans is encoded by the TEX19 gene.

References

Further reading